Akselis Vairogs (born November 8, 1985) is a Latvian basketball coach and a former player, who played the shooting guard position.

Professional career
Vairogs started his career in Ventspils system playing for its farm-club Ventspils Augstskola. In the 2005-06 season, he was loaned to BK Valmiera where he became the top scorer of the Baltic Basketball League averaging 20.9 points in 31 games.

He has spent most of his career playing for Ventspils, but Vairogs also played for Slask Wroclaw in Poland, and Zemgale Jelgava in Latvia and JSA Bordeaux Basket in France.

On August 8, 2014, he re-signed a contract with Ventspils.

On August 10, 2015, he signed with Lithuanian club, BC Lietkabelis.

References

External links
 Eurocup Profile

1985 births
Living people
BC Lietkabelis players
BK Ventspils players
Latvian expatriate basketball people in Estonia
Latvian expatriate basketball people in Lithuania
Latvian expatriate basketball people in Poland
Latvian men's basketball players
Shooting guards